Thermal credits is a new holistic concept which corresponds to the percentage of the climate impact saving obtained through mitigation and adaptation measures applied against global warming, taking as reference the global temperature rise projected in a given time scale. Thermal credits are measured in percentages of global warming reduction in a given time.

Anthropogenic impact 

The reduction of greenhouse gas GHG emissions is recognized by the major number of scientists, experts and politicians as the best strategy to stop global warming. However, there is an increasing number of experts affirming that these mechanisms would not have the desired CO2 reduction concentration effect in the atmosphere as the current emissions rhythm, neither the reduction of postpone a potential rise on the projected temperatures.

The GHG emissions do not only impact human beings, other climate impacts such as changes to agriculture or fauna might be even more intense in local or regional scale. Therefore, the thermal credit is a broader concept that covers jointly mitigation and adaptation strategies in response to anthropogenic climate impact.

The main effects of the major human activities impact on the climate are:

- Net greenhouse gas (GHG) emissions.

- Radioactive changes in the physical properties of the soil cover.

Measuring climate impact 

Thermal credits account the compensation effect of the temperature rise generated by both the reduction of emissions of greenhouse gases and the reduction in heat absorption by changes in physical properties of the use of land in specific projects. So, the thermal credits can be obtained from the development of those projects, technologies or actions that might cause a negative final variation of climate impact produced by itself.

Therefore, in addition to including the mitigation strategies of the carbon credit system as the ultimate form of reducing the overall heat load of the atmosphere, it also includes other lines of action. These lines are based on adaptation strategies for local and regional climate impact, mainly those based on solar radiation management (SRM) through changes of use of the land surface.

The number of thermal credits granted to a specific project to reduce climate impact quantifies the magnitude of reduction in climate impact, and it will depend on the amount of the estimated emissions reduction produced in each implemented solution, as each one of them contributes to the mitigation and adaptation to the climate change in a different way.

Related concepts 

Climate footprint: is a measurement unit of the climate impact produced by a citizen or a firm in the climate system. It accounts for the percentage of the rise of temperatures caused by a person or company related to the global warming. Personal climate footprint is measured in a range from 0 to 5, whereas the climate footprint of a company usually will exceed this threshold.

Climate impact: is the negative effect in terms of temperatures rising that a person or company produces in the climate system.

Corporate Climate Responsibility: is the commitment of businesses to improve their environmental performance by taking actions with the goal of accomplishing environmental benefits in terms of climate impact saving. Climatically responsible companies are the ones taking actions to minimize their impact on the environment and continually improve their environmental performance.

External links 
 coolmyplanet.com
 climateglobalbank.org

Emissions trading